Puhja Parish was a rural municipality in Tartu County, Estonia.

Settlements

Gallery

Twinnings
 Kuhmoinen Municipality, Finland

See also
Kavilda stronghold

References

External links

Municipalities of Estonia
Populated places in Tartu County